Minhaz, known professionally as Gul Panra (sometimes spelled Gulpanra), is a Pakistani Pashto folk singer and touring artist. Her live concerts include United Kingdom and Afghanistan.

In 2015, she sang "Man Aamadeh Am" song's remix version in Persian language with Atif Aslam. In 2018, she sang the song "Hawa Hawa" with the singer Hassan Jahangir. She also serves as brand ambassador for Peshawar Zalmi, a cricket team in Pakistan Super League, and has sung several anthems for the team since its inception in 2016. In 2021, she was featured in the cover version of "Larsha Pekhawar" by Ali Zafar.

Discography

Pashto film songs

References

External links
 
 Instagram

Living people
Pashto-language singers
Pashtun women
Year of birth missing (living people)
21st-century Pakistani women singers